Donacia aequidorsis is a species of leaf beetles of the subfamily of Donaciinae. Distributed in Russia (the northern coast and in the Caspian Sea).

References

Beetles described in 1894
Arthropods of Russia
Donaciinae